Dherai is an administrative unit, known as Union council, of Swat District in the Khyber Pakhtunkhwa province of Pakistan.

Dherai is a village near Saidu Shareef airport, Dherai is divided into two parts Barcham and Kuzcham people of Dherai belong to the largest Pukhtoon tribe Yousafzai as there are many subtribes of Yousafzai, Dherai also has five large, well known families including Adam Khail, Awdal Khail, Barkhan Khail, Saidu Khail and Sultan Khail. Besides these there are some Kashmiris, Miagaan, Mulaan, and Sahibzadgaan families, as well as people of Dherai called Ali Khan Khail.

Business
Most of the people are pretty wealthy because most of them are settled in foreign countries such as the UAE, the UK, the USA, and Europe. Other people own businesses in downtown Dherai, which is called Dherai Chawak.The reasonable numbers of this town belong to Armed Forces, Health and Medical Departments. While largest population doing traditional Agriculture.

History
It is believed that Alexander the Great came through this area and stayed at Dherai for two days.

Notable people

 Captain (R) Jahan Zeb Shah alias Jano

 Qari Umar.
 Rahmat Ullah (Chief Khateeb KPK).
 Qari Rohullah Madni BaraKhan Khail (Chief Khateeb and Ex Minister for religious affairs KPK).
 Mr Mati Ullah BaraKhan Khail (Secretary Finance KPK and member of KPK Public service commission).
 Farhan Khan Medical Student at Pace University New York).
 Jawad Jalil BaraKhan Khail (graduated from Riphah International University Islamabad). (Electrical Engineer).
 Dr Mohammad Salim Khan working at Saudi teaching hospital swat.
 Saeed Khan (senior politician PTI)
 Muhammad Zaheen Khan: Ex-Nazim and senior Politician Awami National Party, Pakistan
 Shamsher Ali Khan (martyr): Former Member of the Provincial Assembly (MPA) Khyber Pukhtunkhwa Awami National Party, Pakistan
 Engr Mukhtar Ahmad Civil Engineer working in private sector and former social worker
 Dr Abdus Samad khan (ex-MS of Saidu Hospital)
 Ismail Shahnamy Graduate Madina University
 Shahbaaz football team

Populated places in Swat District